Earl of March is a title that has been created several times in the Peerage of Scotland and the Peerage of England. The title derived from the "marches" or borderlands between England and either Wales (Welsh Marches) or Scotland (Scottish Marches), and it was held by several great feudal families which owned lands in those districts. Later, however, the title came to be granted as an honorary dignity, and ceased to carry any associated power in the marches.

The Scottish earldom is extant in its own right, and it is held by James Charteris, 13th Earl of Wemyss and 9th Earl of March. The English earldom is today the main non-ducal subsidiary title of the Duke of Richmond. The current duke's eldest son, named Charles like his father, enjoys it as a courtesy title.

Earls of March in the Peerage of Scotland
The Earls of March on the Scottish border were descended from Gospatric, Earl of Northumbria, but being soon afterwards deprived of this position he fled to Scotland, where Máel Coluim III, King of Scotland, welcomed him and granted him Dunbar and the adjoining lands. His successors controlled the Marches, but Earl of March was only assumed as an alternative title to that of Earl of Dunbar by Patrick de Dunbar, 8th Earl of March. The last of his successors was George de Dunbar, 11th Earl of March and Dunbar, whose honours and lands were forfeited to the Crown. He retired to England and died in obscurity.

Following his forfeiture, the next creation of the Earldom of March was for Alexander Stuart, Duke of Albany. At the death of his successor John, the dukedom and earldom became extinct. The next creation was for Robert Stuart, but at his death, the earldom again became extinct.

The most recent Scottish creation of the Earldom of March was in 1697 for Lord William Douglas, second son of the William Douglas, 1st Duke of Queensberry. He was also created Lord Douglas of Neidpath, Lyne and Munard, and Viscount of Peebles, with remainder to heirs male of his body, failing which to his other heirs male and of tailzie.  He was succeeded by his son, also William, who married Anne Douglas-Hamilton, 2nd Countess of Ruglen. They were both succeeded by their son, another William, who became 3rd Earl of March and 3rd Earl of Ruglen.

In 1768 the third earl was created Baron Douglas of Amesbury, and in 1778 he succeeded his first cousin twice removed, Charles Douglas, 3rd Duke of Queensberry, as fourth Duke of Queensberry. The duke died childless in 1810, however, and his titles were inherited by several different individuals. The earldom of Ruglen and barony of Douglas of Amesbury became extinct. The dukedom of Queensberry was inherited by his second cousin once removed, Henry Scott, 3rd Duke of Buccleuch (see the Duke of Buccleuch for later history of this title). The marquessate and earldom of Queensberry passed to his kinsman Sir Charles Douglas, 5th Baronet (see the Marquess of Queensberry for later history of these titles). The earldom of March and its two subsidiary titles were inherited by his second cousin once removed Francis Wemyss-Charteris, later the eighth Earl of Wemyss.

Scottish Earls of March, first Creation
See Earl of Dunbar, for which "Earl of the March" is used as an alternate title

Scottish Earls of March, second Creation (1455)
Alexander Stewart, 1st Duke of Albany (c. 1455–1485)
John Stewart, 2nd Duke of Albany (1481–1536)

Scottish Earls of March, third Creation (1581)
With subsidiary title Lord (of) Dunbar (1581)
Robert Stuart, 1st Earl of March (died 1586)

Scottish Earls of March, fourth Creation (1697)

 William Douglas, 1st Earl of March (1673-1705), second son of William Douglas, 1st Duke of Queensberry
 William Douglas, 2nd Earl of March (d. 1731)
 William Douglas, 4th Duke of Queensberry and 3rd Earl of March (1724-1810)
 Francis Douglas, 8th Earl of Wemyss and 4th Earl of March (1772-1853)

See Earl of Wemyss and March for later holders of the title.

Earls of March in the Peerage of England
The Earls of March on the Welsh Marches were descended from Roger Mortimer, as there had been no single office in this region since the Earl of Mercia. He forfeited his title, which was in the Peerage of England, for treason in 1330, but his descendant Roger managed to have it restored eighteen years later. With the death of the fifth Earl, however, there remained no more Mortimers who were heirs to the first Earl, and the title passed to Richard Plantagenet, Duke of York. Duke Richard passed the title on to his son Edward, who would later become King Edward IV, causing the earldom of March to merge into the Crown.

In the Peerage of England, the next creation of the earldom came when Edward Plantagenet, Duke of Cornwall was made Earl of March in 1479. In 1483, he succeeded as King Edward V, and the earldom merged in the crown. Later that year, however, his uncle Richard of Gloucester acceded to the throne as Richard III. The fate of the young Edward and his brother, Richard has never been confirmed.

The next English creation was in favour of Esme Stewart, the third Duke of Lennox.  His successors bore the earldom, until the death of the sixth Duke, when both the earldom and the dukedom became extinct. The last English creation was in favour of Charles Lennox, 1st Duke of Richmond and Lennox. His successors have borne the English earldom of March since then.

English Earls of March, first Creation (1328)
Roger Mortimer, 1st Earl of March (1287–1330) (forfeit 1330)
Roger Mortimer, 2nd Earl of March (1328–1360) (restored 1348 (barony), 1354 (earldom))
Edmund Mortimer, 3rd Earl of March (1351–1381)
Roger Mortimer, 4th Earl of March (1374–1398)
Edmund Mortimer, 5th Earl of March (1391–1425)
Richard Plantagenet, 3rd Duke of York, 6th Earl of March (1411–1460)
Edward Plantagenet, 4th Duke of York, 7th Earl of March (1442–1483) (became King in 1461)

English Earls of March, second Creation (1479)
Edward, Duke of Cornwall (1470–1483?) (proclaimed King in 1483)

English Earls of March, third Creation (1619)
Esmé Stewart, 3rd Duke of Lennox (1579–1624)
James Stewart, 1st Duke of Richmond (1612–1655)
Esmé Stewart, 2nd Duke of Richmond (1649–1660)
Charles Stewart, 3rd Duke of Richmond (1639–1672)

English Earls of March, fourth Creation (1675)

The title is now held by the Duke of Richmond, and is used as a courtesy title by his heir apparent, currently Charles Henry Gordon-Lennox (born 1994), Earl of March and Kinrara.

See also
Marcher Lords – English title for the Welsh Marches
List of Marcher lordships

References

 

 
Earldoms in the Peerage of Scotland
Extinct earldoms in the Peerage of Scotland
Earldoms in the Peerage of England
British and Irish peerages which merged in the Crown
Peerages created with special remainders
Noble titles created in 1328
Noble titles created in 1455
Noble titles created in 1479
Noble titles created in 1581
Noble titles created in 1619
Noble titles created in 1675
Noble titles created in 1697